UUA or Unitarian Universalist Association is a liberal religious association of Unitarian Universalist congregations.

UUA or Uua may also refer to:
 Bugulma Airport's IATA code
 Ua (singer) or Uua, Japanese singer
 UUA, a pilot report code for an "urgent" message
 UUA, a codon for leucine
United Utilities Australia or TRILITY, an Australian water utility, acquired by INCJ and others